The 1640s BC was a decade lasting from January 1, 1649 BC to December 31, 1640 BC.

Events and trends

Significant people
Bazaya, King of Assyria, r. 1650–1622 BC
Ammi-Ditana, King of Babylonia, r. 1684–1647 BC (Middle Chronology)
Ammi-Saduqa, King of Babylonia, r. 1647–1626 BC (Middle Chronology)
Tang, Shang Dynasty King of China, r. 1675–1646 BC
Tài Dīng, Shang Dynasty King of China, r. 1646–1644 BC
Bu Bing, Shang Dynasty King of China, r. 1644–1612 BC
Salitis, Fifteenth dynasty Pharaoh of Egypt, r. c.1648–1628 BC
Djehuti, Sixteenth Dynasty Pharaoh of Egypt, r. c.1650–1647 BC
Sobekhotep VIII, Sixteenth Dynasty Pharaoh of Egypt, r. c.1647–1631 BC
Kuk-Nashur II, King of Elam, r. c. 1650–1635 BC
Hattusili I, King of the Hittites, r. c.1650–1620 BC (middle chronology)
Kashtiliash II, King of the Kassites, r. 1650–1640 BC
Urzigurumash, King of the Kassites, r. 1640–1630 BC
Ishkibal, King of the Sealand, r. 1657–1642 BC
Shushshi, King of the Sealand, r. 1642–1618 BC

References